Quester Tangent Corporation (QTC) is an independent North American supplier of train electronics and software for the rail transit industry. Quester Tangent designs, develops and manufactures vehicle monitoring hardware and software for the global rail transit industry, including monitoring and control products, on-train displays, communication and data networks, and passenger information systems.

Quester Tangent facilities include  of working space.

History
Founded in 1983, Quester Tangent Corporation initially served the marine sciences markets, providing equipment and systems for non-destructive, acoustic remote sensing of the seabed to assist with seabed classification and environmental monitoring. In 1994, Quester Tangent started producing monitoring and diagnostic systems for the rail transit industry.

Rail Transit Products
With over 7,000 products installed in revenue-service, Quester Tangent supplies train management, passenger information and fleet diagnostics systems for new builds, retrofits and overhauls.

Products include monitoring and control, on-train displays, event recorders, communication and data networks, passenger information systems, and wayside software:

FleetWise Software
TestWise
TrainWise Monitoring and Control
TrainWise Networks
TrainWise Passenger Information
TrainWise Engineering Management Interface
TrainWise Train Configuration Manager
Train Display Panels
Driver Display Units
Fault Display Panels
Controllers
Event Recorders
Train Network Controllers
Train-Wayside Controllers
Emergency Braking Acceleration Limiting Devices (EBALD)
Brake Assurance Monitors (BAM)
Low Voltage Power Supplied and Controllers
Driving Simulators

Quester Tangent also offers a number of services: 

System integration 
Project management 
Custom engineering 
Manufacturing 
Maintenance and warranty support 
Customer service 
Training

Clients
Clients include:

Detroit People Mover
Maryland Transit Administration (MTA) 
Massachusetts Bay Transportation Authority (MBTA)
Metropolitan Atlanta Rapid Transit Authority (MARTA)
Metropolitan Transportation Authority (MTA)
NJ Transit (NJT)
New York City Transit Authority (NYCT)
Port Authority Transit Corporation (PATCO)
Rapid KL
SkyTrain / British Columbia Rapid Transit Company (BCRTC)
Southeastern Pennsylvania Transportation Authority (SEPTA)
Washington Metropolitan Area Transit Authority (WMATA)

Countries Served
Currently, Quester Tangent is associated with operations in:

Canada
China
France
Italy
Japan
Korea
Malaysia
USA

Historically, Quester Tangent Marine Division operated in:

Australia
Belgium
Brazil
Canada
Chile
China
Croatia
Cyprus
Denmark
England
France
Germany
Iceland
India
Iran
Ireland
Israel
Italy
Japan
Lithuania
Malaysia
Mexico
Netherlands
New Zealand
Norway
Portugal
Romania
Russia
Scotland
Singapore
Spain
Taiwan
UAE
USA
Wales

Marine Products
On August 12, 2014, ownership of Quester Tangent's Marine Division - including all the assets, intellectual properties and patents of the QTC Seabed Classification technologies - was successfully transferred to Maritime Way Scientific Ltd. Products and services of the former Quester Tangent Marine Division included QTC SWATHVIEW data processing system for multibeam and sidescan sonars, and the IMPACT12 and QTC VIEW single beam classification systems.

Honours and awards
Quester Tangent was a finalist in the Advancing Technology & Innovation category of the 2014 BC Export Awards.

In June 2013, Quester Tangent won the VIATeC Award for Technology Company of the Year.

References

External links
Company Website
Quester Tangent at Industry Canada

Manufacturing companies of Canada
Companies based in British Columbia
Companies established in 1983